Dan za nas is the Serbian edition of an album by the Macedonian singer Toše Proeski released in 2004. He also released a Macedonian version, Den Za Nas. Dan Za Nas means "Day For Us".

This album includes the English version of his song "Life" which he performed in the Eurovision Song Contest 2004 for Macedonia. It also has the song "Čija si", which Proeski was due to perform for Serbia and Montenegro for the Eurovision Song Contest 2003 but the EBU told Serbia and Montenegro that they had to withdraw due to too many countries wishing to compete.

Apart from "Life", all of the songs are performed in Serbo-Croatian.

Track listing
(Titles in brackets are for rough translation purposes only)

Zvezdo severnice 
Kad varaš ti (When you Cheat)
Žena Balkanska (Balkan Women)
Ima li dan za nas (Is there a day for us)
Kažem lejdi (I say Lady)
Nikada (Never)
Čija si (Whose Are You)
Life
Pogledaj u mene (Look at me)
San egzotičan (Exotic dream)
Oprosti (Sorry)
Što si otišla (As you went)
Hej plavooka, hej bosonoga (Hey, blue-eyed, hey Barefoot)
Kad srce plati stari dug (When the heart has to pay the old debt)

The Croatian and Slovenian releases had the following as bonus tracks:
Čini (magic)
Soba za tugu (Room for grief)

"Čija si" and "Life" are billed as bonus tracks. The six tracks which follow are Serbian language versions of six of the songs performed by Toše Proeski in the Macedonian national final in 2004.

References

Toše Proeski albums
2004 albums

mk:Ден за нас (албум)